Ich werde 100 Jahre alt is a studio album by the Dutch singer and actor Johannes Heesters with only one single. It is the best selling album from Heesters.

Track listing

 "Ich werde 100 Jahre alt" – 3:37
 "Ein bisschen Liebe gehört zum Leben" – 0:30 
 "Hochzeitsnacht im Paradis (1)" – 2:53
 "Hochzeitsnacht im Paradis (2)" – 2:56
 "Bist du's lachendes Glück?" – 0:42
 "Mein Auto kann schön singen" – 0:24 
 "Eine nach der Anderen" – 3:50
 "Über die Prärie" [only ringtone] – 0:03 
 "Sehnsucht nach dir" – 3:06
 "Angelika Senerade" – 2:55
 "Sweetheart (will you remember me)" – 3:05
 "Ich werde jede Nacht von ihnen Träumen" – 0:25
 "Besame Mucho" – 0:02
 "Das kommt mir spanisch vor" – 3:07         
 "Ich werde 100 Jahre alt [other version] – 3:37
 "Die Kraft meines Lebens" – 3:37
 bonus track since September 2004: "Ciao"

Charts

2003 albums
Johannes Heesters albums